Florence Apartments is a historic apartment building located at Scranton, Lackawanna County, Pennsylvania.  It was built in 1908, and is a six-story, "U"-shaped building with Colonial Revival style design details.  It has a steel and concrete structure with exterior limestone on the first and second stories and brick above.  The front facade features two three-story rectangular bays clad in pressed metal and the main entrance is surrounded by two Tuscan order columns supporting an entablature inscribed with the name "Florence."  It was the first multi-story apartment building in Scranton.

It was added to the National Register of Historic Places in 1984.

References

Residential buildings on the National Register of Historic Places in Pennsylvania
Colonial Revival architecture in Pennsylvania
Residential buildings completed in 1908
Buildings and structures in Scranton, Pennsylvania
Apartment buildings in Pennsylvania
National Register of Historic Places in Lackawanna County, Pennsylvania
1908 establishments in Pennsylvania